The Luofu Bridge is a bridge in Fuxing District, Taoyuan City, Taiwan.

Architecture
The bridge was built over the Dahan River along Provincial Highway 7.

See also
 List of bridges in Taiwan

References

Bridges in Taoyuan City
Bridges completed in 1992